Both Ways may refer to:

Both Ways, a 2018 album by Donovan Woods
Both Ways , a 2021 album by The Jeffrey Lewis & Peter Stampfel Band 
"Both Ways", a 2019 song by Liam Payne from LP1
"Both Ways", a 2018 song by Stefflon Don from Secure (mixtape)